is a Japanese manga series written by Kenji Inoue and illustrated by Kimitake Yoshioka. It has been serialized in Kodansha's seinen manga magazine good! Afternoon since April 2014. The manga is published digitally in English by Kodansha USA under the Kodansha Comics imprint. An anime television series adaptation by Zero-G aired from July to September 2018 in the Animeism programming block on MBS. A live-action film adaptation was released in August 2020.

Plot
Iori Kitahara looks forward to his new life on the Izu Peninsula as he prepares to start his college life there, staying in a room above his uncle's diving shop "Grand Blue." However, he is quickly shocked as he meets the local Diving Club, a group full of buff men who spend more time drinking, partying, and stripping naked than actually diving. Despite his attempts to distance himself from the group, Iori gets quickly swept up in their antics, while his cousins try to show him the wonders of diving into the ocean and sea.

Characters

Played by: Ryo Ryusei (live-action film)
Iori is a first year Mechanical Engineering student at Izu University who had never learned to swim, despite being part of the diving club. Though he initially tries to live a normal life, Iori quickly got pulled into the "Peek a Boo" Diving Club's activities often ended with drunk, naked revelry. He often acts aloof and boisterous but he treasures his relationships to the point he will repress his worse traits when necessary. Although his father was adopted by the Kotegawas, he sees Chisa and Nanaka as family. Iori's open, earnest nature wins over several characters he encounters throughout the story although his initially childish tendencies led him into conflict with said individuals. In the past he enjoyed writing songs and dreamed of creating a band, memories he finds embarrassing due to his previous dearth of skill and saccharine sentiment. Iori is skilled at playing tennis, volleyball, and almost any other sport involving precise aim. He has a neurotic habit of overthinking straightforward problems with over-the-top, wild speculations.

Played by: Yūki Yoda (live-action film)
Iori's cousin and classmate at Izu University, Chisa is a smart and attractive girl with a passion for diving. Compared to the other members in the Peek a Boo club, Chisa is portrayed as the most "normal". She is level-headed, reserved, and rarely partakes in drunken shenanigans. She is uninterested in romance. To her chagrin, she was forced to fend off regular attempts by other university students to hit on her. Chisa's main ambition is to become a dive instructor like her mother so she immerses herself in diving culture over anything else. She wasn't above using others to preserve her solitude, including feigning a relationship with Iori to drive off suitors and punish him for going out of his way to help Aina instead of her during the beauty contest. Her relationship with Iori vacillates between tenderness over a shared love of diving and cold disgust at his boisterous nature. As a result of a chilly relationship with her mother, Chisa does not openly express her feelings. In emotional scenarios, she tended to get flustered and lose her composure.

Played by: Masahiro Takashima (live-action film)
The owner of the diving shop Grand Blue and Iori's uncle, as well as father of Chisa and Nanaka.

Played by: Aya Asahina (live-action film)
A voluptuous woman and diving instructor at Grand Blue who mostly observes the diving club's antics. She is the least involved with PAB's drinking parties, and the members have admitted they are more reserved in stripping and drinking when she is there. She is secretly infatuated with Chisa, despite being her sister, but she has admitted she would support Iori if he promised to make Chisa happy. Ironically, Nanaka is uncomfortable or clueless about most things sexual, leading her to stumble into perverted situations with Iori and Azusa. She possesses frightening strength that manifests whenever she sees a possible threat to her relationship with Chisa.

Played by: Atsuhiro Inukai (live-action film)
Iori's best friend, with whom he has a friendly rivalry. Kōhei is a hardcore otaku who often wears shirts with his favorite anime girl character on them. He came to the university to chase his impossible dream of running a harem of cute high-school girls and ends up getting roped into Peek a Boo. Many of Kōhei's comedic antics are drawn from his obsession with anime culture and subsequent detachment from reality. He is often clueless in reading social situations or conflates their dynamics with parallels from his favorite shows. One running gag is how easily he is manipulated by other Peek a Boo members through his love of famous female voice actors; in particular, his admiration of Kaya Mizuki becomes a relevant plot point in multiple arcs. In rarer circumstances he showcases remarkable resilience, strength, and astuteness when his anime-related interests are threatened. At first glance, Kōhei's relationship with Iori is defined by slapstick violence and rancor over petty, trivial disagreements, but he cares for his friend's well-being and is dependable when it really counts. It's subtly implied he comes from a wealthy background.

Played by: Suzunosuke Tanaka (live-action film)
A senior student at Izu and member of Peek a Boo who often got himself and other club members drunk and naked, Tokita is a muscular, laid-back college student who loved to party. However, just like the other members of PAB, he sincerely loves diving and takes the possible dangers seriously. To Iori's surprise, he has a girlfriend.

Played by: Hiroaki Iwanaga (live-action film)
A senior student at Izu and member of Peek a Boo who often got himself and other club members drunk and naked. Kotobuki is just like Tokita both in appearance and in personality when they are partying, but Kotobuki can be surprisingly charismatic. He works as a professional bartender part-time.

Played by: Yuka Ogura (live-action film)
A senior student from Oumi Women's College and member of Peek a Boo who often parties with the other senior members, despite being one of the few women in the club. She is portrayed with an unwittingly sensual and seductive demeanor leading her younger contemporaries to assume she's sexually experienced. However her promiscuity is largely limited to an erotic obsession with Nanaka, which is played up for laughs. She has an unrequited crush on Tokita but believes pursuing it would damage the dynamics of the senior Peek a Boo group. Azusa is extremely lax about her appearance and often catches people off-guard by stripping without a second thought. She initially grows close to Iori after mistakenly concluding he's bisexual, seeking him as a possible confidant with whom she can discuss her own fetishes. Azusa has a generous spirit and acute perception that compels her to help other Peek a Boo members with their personal troubles. This is mixed with a mischievous streak that ends up complicating matters in humorous ways.

Played by: Ren Ishikawa (live-action film)
A freshman from Oumi Women's College and a former member of the Tennis Club "Tinkerbell." Nicknamed "Cakey" due to the large amount of makeup she used to put on her face in an attempt to be more popular with guys, Aina later joins Peek a Boo after Iori and Kōhei stand up for her. Although she initially asks out Kōhei, she develops persistent romantic feelings for Iori after he humiliates Captain Kudō to avenge her bullying at the hands of Tinkerbell. Without her makeup on Aina is much more mild-mannered and bashful, and often played the tsukkomi role to the crazy antics around her. She was the only one in the group who couldn't cook well, and was the clumsiest of them all. She grew up on a farm and as a result, is quite skilled at manual labor including driving stick shift. Her country background made her self-conscious about her rural accent, which she occasionally slips into whenever nervous, and enamored of activities she associates with glamorous city life. Aina's isolated childhood fosters a naive romantic outlook which derives her ideas of love from movies and books. Out of all Peek a Boo members she was the most bashful about her body type. She negatively compares herself to Nanaka and Azusa, only able to act extroverted when she had makeup on. Contrary to appearance, she turns into a terrifying party animal after imbibing a small amount of alcohol.

Played by: Yuya Hirata (live-action film)
The Captain of the Tennis Club "Tinkerbell" and an attractive playboy who was publicly humiliated by Iori and Kōhei due to his mistreatment of Aina.

A famous voice actor and idol who is acquainted with Peek a Boo on account of her diving hobby. She is friends with Azusa and thinks highly of Iori. She is Kōhei's favorite voice actress.

Played by: Yūki Morinaga (live-action film)
One of Iori's classmates at Izu University. A self-styled playboy who is largely unsuccessful in attracting a lover. Although he tries to be charismatic, it usually comes off as lame.

Played by: Yūma Yamoto (live-action film)
One of Iori's classmates at Izu University. Incredibly blunt in his desire to find a girlfriend, he is often teased by his friends he will be a lifelong virgin.

One of Iori's classmates at Izu University. A muscular man, and the most decent and innocent of Iori's friends. He is often portrayed as invisible to other significant characters as a on-running joke.

One of Iori's classmates at Izu University. Unlike most of the others Yu is in a relationship with his childhood friend Rie, which his friends immediately attempt to sabotage once they find out. Through a self-destructive desire to flirt or his friends' machinations, he finds himself beaten up by Rie on multiple occasions.

Iori's little sister, a third-year middle school student who often walks around in an old-fashioned kimono. She pretends to show affection to Iori while secretly trying to mold him into taking ownership of their family's ryokan so she will not have to, as she seeks to escape the stringent demands placed upon her by her parents. Shiori is unusually cunning and intelligent for her age, able to construct surveillance equipment as well as maintain a facade as a impeccably mannered young girl who dotes on her brother. She later develops genuine respect for Iori although she still dismisses him as dim-witted and irresponsible.

Media

Manga
Grand Blue is written by Kenji Inoue and illustrated by Kimitake Yoshioka. The series began in Kodansha's good! Afternoon on April 7, 2014. Kodansha has compiled its chapters into individual tankōbon volumes. The first volume was released on November 7, 2014. As of August 2022, nineteen volumes have been released.

Kodansha USA is publishing the series digitally in English under the name of Grand Blue Dreaming with sixteen volumes published as of July 2022.

Anime

An anime television series adaptation was announced in the Good! Afternoon magazine's fourth issue of 2018 on March 7. The anime series is written and directed by Shinji Takamatsu, with Takamatsu also handling the sound direction, Zero-G produced the animation and Hideoki Kusama designed the characters. It aired from July 14 to September 29, 2018, and broadcast on the Animeism programming block on MBS, TBS, BS-TBS, and AT-X. The series is also streamed exclusively on Amazon Video worldwide. The opening theme song titled "Grand Blue" is performed by Shōnan no Kaze, while the ending theme song titled  is performed by Izu no Kaze (a group formed by Yūma Uchida, Ryohei Kimura, Hiroki Yasumoto, and Katsuyuki Konishi). The series ran for 12 episodes.

Film
A live-action film adaptation was announced, and is directed by Tsutomu Hanabusa. It was originally scheduled to release on May 29, 2020, but it was postponed to August 7, 2020 due to the COVID-19 pandemic.

Reception
As of March 2023, the manga series had over 8 million volumes in print.

See also
 TenPuru, another manga series illustrated by Kimitake Yoshioka

Notes

References

External links
  
 Grand Blue on Kodansha's online store 
 Grand Blue Dreaming on Kodansha US's online store 
 Grand Blue Dreaming on Azuki 
 

Anime series based on manga
Animeism
Book censorship in China
Comedy anime and manga
Films postponed due to the COVID-19 pandemic
Japanese comedy films
Kodansha manga
Live-action films based on manga
Manga adapted into films
NBCUniversal Entertainment Japan
Seinen manga
Slice of life anime and manga
Warner Bros. films
Zero-G (studio)